The  Berestye Archeological Museum, located in the city of Brest, Belarus, is a museum centered around an archaeological site displaying an authentic East Slavic wooden town dating back to the 13th century. Unique in Europe, the 1800 square meter site was excavated by archeologists of the Belarusian Academy of Sciences between 1968 and 1981. The project was supervised by Dr. P.F.Lysenko. In 1982, a modern structure of concrete, glass and aluminum in the shape of a huge pitched roof was erected over the archeological site. The museum was opened on March 2, 1982. The museum displays preserved 28 log cabins, as well over 1400 artifacts dating back to 10th and 14th centuries which were unearthed during  the excavation.

External links 
 Top 15 of the most incredible museums in Belarus

Further reading
Лысенко, П.Ф. “Берестье” (Berestye by P.F.Lysenko). Minsk, (1985) (in Russian)
Лысенко, П.Ф. “Отрытие Берестья” (The Discovery of Berestye by P.F.Lysenko). Minsk, (1989); (2007) second edition  (in Russian)

Buildings and structures in Brest, Belarus
Archaeological sites in Belarus
Museums in Brest Region
Archaeological museums
History museums in Belarus
Open-air museums
Outdoor structures in Belarus